The Near East Archaeological Society Bulletin (NEASB) is a peer-reviewed journal published annually by the Near East Archaeological Society (NEAS).

Since the first volume in 1958, the bulletin has printed articles and book reviews on ancient Near Eastern archaeology, literature, epigraphy, philology, anthropology, art, and the  The articles often  assess the current state of scholarship, provide up-to-date excavation reports, and resolve methodological problems of excavation and other research issues.

The bulletin is distributed in hard copy by the NEAS and electronically by Logos Bible Software. It is indexed (or approved for indexing) in the Atla Religion Database, Old Testament Abstracts, andChristian Periodical Index, and is listed as ISSN 0739-0068 (WorldCat, Library of Congress) and OCLC no. 1714481 (WorldCat, Library of Congress).

NEASB was formerly titled Near Eastern Archaeology: Bulletin of the Near East Archaeological Society (1958–1967) and
Bulletin Series of the Near East Archaeological Society (1971–1974).

External links 
 NEAS website

Archaeology journals